Curt Gustav Mauritz Mattson (30 October 1900 – 13 July 1965) was a Finnish sailor. He competed in the mixed 6 metres at the 1936 Summer Olympics.

References

External links
 
 

1900 births
1965 deaths
People from Mariehamn
Olympic sailors of Finland
Sailors at the 1936 Summer Olympics – 6 Metre
Finnish male sailors (sport)
Sportspeople from Åland